Muhammad Arshad (born 15 May 1979) is a Pakistani professional Kabaddi player. He was member of the Pakistan national kabaddi team that won Asian bronze medals in 2010 in Guangzhou.

References

Living people
1979 births
Pakistani kabaddi players
Asian Games medalists in kabaddi
Kabaddi players at the 2006 Asian Games
Kabaddi players at the 2010 Asian Games
Asian Games silver medalists for Pakistan
Asian Games bronze medalists for Pakistan
Medalists at the 2006 Asian Games
Medalists at the 2010 Asian Games